Orekhovo-Borisovo Severnoye District, commonly known as Orekhovo-Borisovo, is a district in Southern Administrative Okrug of Moscow, Russia, located on the spot of former villages of Orekhovo, Borisovo, Shipilovo, Zyablikovo, and Brateyevo. In the early 1970s, mass housing construction was started in the area, and a microdistrict was built. Its main landmark is the Orekhovo-Borisovo Cathedral.

References

Districts of Moscow